Zhejiang Dianka Automobile Technology Co. Ltd., trading as Enovate or originally Dearcc, is an automobile manufacturing company headquartered in Zhejiang, China, specialising in producing electric cars.

History
June 23, 2015: Zhejiang Dianka Automobile Technology Co. Ltd. founded.
November 17, 2017: Dearcc EV10 electric city car launched in the market.
April 3, 2018: Construction for the production base in Shaoxing started.
July 7, 2018: Sales of the range extended version of the Dearcc EV10, the EV10 Pro300 started in Shanghai.

Models and products
Dearcc EV10
Enovate ME5
Enovate ME7
Enovate ME-S Concept

References

External links
 Official website 

Car manufacturers of China
Electric vehicle manufacturers of China
Vehicle manufacturing companies established in 2015
Chinese companies established in 2015
Chinese brands
Luxury motor vehicle manufacturers
Manufacturing companies based in Hangzhou